Felipe Abdiel Baloy Ramírez (born 24 February 1981) is a Panamanian former professional footballer who played as a defender. He scored Panama’s first ever goal in a FIFA World Cup, against England at the 2018 edition.

Early life
He was the second youngest of his seven brothers and grew in the populous barrio of Cerro Batea in the San Miguelito district after moving from the San Martin barrio. Pipe grew interested in football after playing in the streets with his friends.

Baloy graduated from elementary and high school, never continued on to university, and instead pursued his career in football where "things have been going well".

Club career

Early career
At age 18, he started his football career in ANAPROF team Eurokickers, although it lasted only a year as the team was relegated that year. He then moved to Sporting '89 and managed to be part of the Panama U-20 squad where he was spotted by Colombian international representative Luis Felipe Posso, was signed to his agency and the doors opened for Baloy in Colombia.

Colombia
At age 19, Baloy moved to Colombia to play for Copa Mustang team Envigado in 2001. He played a year with Antioquia before moving to Independiente Medellín. With Medellín he had more success; he played in Copa Libertadores in 2003 where DIM finished 3rd. After 2003, he was signed by Brazil's Grêmio.

Brazil
Baloy started his career in Brazil with Grêmio where he played the Campeonato Brasileiro Série A 2003-2004 season. He Finished 20th (2003) and 24th (2004). Baloy was signed by Clube Atlético Paranaense but he was in 2004 with Porto Alegre; they were eliminated in the first round. Baloy was also made captain in Grêmio despite his youth.

In Clube Atlético Paranaense, Baloy had some success after finishing 6th in the Campeonato Brasileiro Série A 2005 and playing on the side that finished runner-up in the Copa Libertadores 2005. However Baloy did not play the final because he was signed by Monterrey and had to depart to Mexico. He was also captain of the Curitiba side.

Mexico
Baloy arrived in 2005 to Mexico to play for Monterrey in the Primera División (First Division), he debuted on 30 July 2005 in the 1–2 C.F. Pachuca match. However Baloy had to settle in with the Mexican fans since he was replacing a fan favourite, the Argentine Defender Pablo Rotchen. After a couple of good performances, Baloy gained fan favour.
In 2005, Pipe had a good start with Rayados where in the 2005 Apertura the team was runner-up. After that season, Monterrey were not at the same competitive level as they were before; but Baloy managed to stand out in the team and was called one of the best defenders in Mexico numerous times.

In 2007, Baloy played in the 2007 Copa Libertadores after he was loaned out to Club América for that competition.

In later years, Baloy was linked to several clubs in Europe. In the 2007 winter transfer window he attracted the interest of Premier League side Derby County, however the move never happened. In 2008, he was linked to Premier League side Arsenal.

On the 2009 Apertura, Baloy and Monterrey were crowned champions after defeating Cruz Azul in a 6–4 aggregate score. Baloy became the first Panamanian-born player to ever win the Mexican First Division championship. Pipe was nominated that year for the Mexican Golden Ball as best defender of the year, but came in second behind his team mate Duilio Davino.

Shortly after winning the championship, Baloy made a surprise move to Santos Laguna. That ended a four-year spell in Monterrey where he played 145 times and scored 10 goals.

On 14 December 2013 it was announced Baloy was sold to Monarcas Morelia.

International career
Baloy scored Panama's first and only goal, so far, for the team in the World Cup. He captained the Panama national team for many years including in Russia 2018. He played alongside José Luis Garcés, Luis Tejada, Jaime Penedo among others.

As youngster, Baloy played in the Panama U-20 squad which attempted to qualify to the 2001 FIFA World Youth Championship in Argentina. He made his senior debut for Panama in a May 2001 UNCAF Nations Cup match against Honduras and has, as of 17 November 2017, earned a total of 100 caps, scoring 3 goals. Pipe has represented Panama participating in the 2006 FIFA World Cup qualification. He was also part of the 2005 and 2007 CONCACAF Gold Cup Best XI. He also was part of the side that finished runner-up on both 2005 CONCACAF Gold Cup and UNCAF Nations Cup 2007.

In May 2018 he was named in Panama’s preliminary 35 man squad for the 2018 FIFA World Cup in Russia. He figured in the final squad later on. On 24 June 2018, Baloy scored the first Panama goal in a World Cup match in the 1–6 loss against England. He retired from international football after Russia 2018. In Russia he became the oldest debutante to score in a World Cup match.

International goals
Scores and results list Panama's goal tally first.

Personal life
Felipe Baloy is married with three children, and lives in Panama with his family. He is a naturalized citizen of Mexico. He has a close friendship with his Panama national team mates Blas Pérez and Gabriel Enrique Gómez.

Honours

Monterrey
 Primera División: Apertura 2009

Santos Laguna
 Primera División: Clausura 2012

Individual
 2005 CONCACAF Gold Cup Tournament Best XI
 CONCACAF Gold Cup All-Tournament team: 2007

See also
 List of men's footballers with 100 or more international caps

References

External links
 
 
 

1981 births
2001 UNCAF Nations Cup players
2005 CONCACAF Gold Cup players
2007 CONCACAF Gold Cup players
2007 UNCAF Nations Cup players
2009 CONCACAF Gold Cup players
2011 CONCACAF Gold Cup players
2011 Copa Centroamericana players
2018 FIFA World Cup players
Association football defenders
C.F. Monterrey players
Campeonato Brasileiro Série A players
Categoría Primera A players
Club América footballers
Atlas F.C. footballers
Club Athletico Paranaense players
Copa América Centenario players
C.S.D. Municipal players
Envigado F.C. players
Expatriate footballers in Brazil
Expatriate footballers in Colombia
Expatriate footballers in Guatemala
Expatriate footballers in Mexico
FIFA Century Club
Grêmio Foot-Ball Porto Alegrense players
Independiente Medellín footballers
Liga MX players
Liga Panameña de Fútbol players
Liga Nacional de Fútbol de Guatemala players
Living people
Atlético Morelia players
Naturalized citizens of Mexico
Panama international footballers
Panamanian emigrants to Mexico
Panamanian expatriate footballers
Panamanian expatriate sportspeople in Colombia
Panamanian expatriate sportspeople in Mexico
Panamanian footballers
Mexican people of Panamanian descent
Águilas Doradas Rionegro players
Santos Laguna footballers
Sporting San Miguelito players
Sportspeople from Panama City
Tauro F.C. players